is a Japanese footballer who plays as a defensive midfielder or a left back for Belgian club Kortrijk on loan from Shonan Bellmare.

Club career
On 22 August 2022, Tanaka joined Kortrijk in Belgium on loan with an option to buy.

Career statistics

References

External links

2002 births
Living people
People from Nagano (city)
Association football people from Nagano Prefecture
Japanese footballers
Japan youth international footballers
Association football midfielders
AC Nagano Parceiro players
Shonan Bellmare players
K.V. Kortrijk players
J1 League players
Japanese expatriate footballers
Expatriate footballers in Belgium
Japanese expatriate sportspeople in Belgium